The Hellpreacher is the third full-length album from death metal supergroup Birds of Prey. It was released April 28, 2009 through Relapse Records.

Overview

The Hellpreacher is a concept album that gives the listener a first person perspective into the life a prison inmate turned priest. The album begins when the protagonist is only a child and follows him through a childhood full of rape and abuse which eventually finds the protagonist incarcerated, undergoing more physical abuse and rape. While in prison, the protagonist has a religious conversion and slowly starts to build a militaristic cult, that becomes the downfall for not only the protagonist but everyone else who is a part of this unholy lifestyle.

Track listing
 "Momma" - 3:49
 "Juvie" - 5:52
 "As the Field Mice Play" - 1:16
 "Alive Inside!" - 3:19
 "Tempt the Disciples" - 3:51
 "Taking on our Winter Blood" - 2:13
 "The Excavation" - 3:19
 "Blind Faith" - 3:18
 "False Prophet" - 3:48
 "The Owl Closes In" - 1:58
 "Warriors of Mud...The Hellfighters" - 3:59
 "Giving up the Ghost" - 4:32

Personnel
 Ben Hogg (Vocals)
 Eric Larson (Guitar) 
 Bo Leslie (Guitar) 
 Summer Welch (Bass) 
 Dave Witte (Drums)

External links
 Official Birds of Prey Myspace
 Official Relapse Records Website
 [ "The Hellpreacher" reviewed at allmusic by Greg Prato]

References

2009 albums
Birds of Prey (band) albums